VPS37B, ESCRT-I subunit is a protein that in humans is encoded by the VPS37B gene.

References

Further reading